Nógrád is a village in Nógrád County, Hungary.

Etymology
The name comes from Slavic Novgrad ("New Castle") from which evolved Slovak Novohrad (with the same meaning) and Hungarian Nógrád. 1138/1329 civitas Naugrad, around 1200 castrum Nougrad, 1217 castrum de Nevgrad. The village (1405 villa Newgrad) and the county was named after the castle.

References

External links 
 Street map 

Populated places in Nógrád County